Prawda is an unincorporated community in the Rural Municipality of Reynolds, situated a few miles east of Hadashville on the Trans Canada Highway in eastern Manitoba. The population of this community is 200. The community's amenities include two service stations/convenience store & restaurants (Birchwood Esso and Prawda Shell) and a campground (Pinetree).
  
The area was settled by Ukrainian, Polish, and Russian settlers starting about 1907. By 1932, there was a post office opened which operated until 1969. The community's name comes from the Polish word prawda, which means 'truth'. The name may have come from Evangeline Andrusko, the postmistress who named the post office after a town of the same name in her native Poland. The name has also been attributed to a local school named by Harry Paskaryk.

A school district was part of the community with the school located on section NE 31-2-6E. The present-day school is Reynolds Elementary School and serves K to 6, after which the students are bussed to Whitemouth, Manitoba. The area is agricultural and has ties to the forestry industry. Prawda is also home to a livestock feed store (Trails End Livestock), satellite services (Bert's Satellite), plumber (Kuharski Bros.), nurseries (Bilan Tree Nursery, NJ Enterprises, Pips River Nursery), and a community club (Reynolds Community Club). Residents travel to Whitemouth, Ste. Anne, Steinbach, or Winnipeg for medical needs. Reynolds Fire Department, built in 2005, is located at Prawda. The telephone area code for Prawda is 204.

References 

 Geographic Names of Manitoba - Prawda pg. 219 : published by the Millennium Bureau of Canada
 the Rural Municipality of Reynolds - Prawda

Unincorporated communities in Eastman Region, Manitoba